Two Laughing Boys with a Mug of Beer is an oil-on-canvas painting by Frans Hals, created c. 1626, showing a Kannekijker (mug-looker). Someone looking into a mug refers to an old Dutch word for a glutton, greedy for more. This visual theme was also used to depict sight as one of the five senses, and various people have argued about whether this portrait was meant as one in a series of the five senses along with Two Boys singing for hearing and a variant version of The Smoker for smell:

Hals has included an accomplice peering over the central figure's shoulder, and besides the other two paintings already mentioned, this theme of a main subject with a secondary witness was common to many of his paintings of the 1620s:

The theme of looking into a mug was also used by Hals when he painted the portrait of Peeckelhaeringh who turns to the viewer to show his mug.
The painting of two laughing boys with mug of beer is in the collection of the Hofje van Mevrouw van Aerden.

It has been stolen three times in 1988, 2011, and 2020. After it was stolen on 27 April 2011, it was recovered on 28 October 2011. It was reported stolen again on 27 August 2020 from the Hofje van Mevrouw van Aerden museum in Leerdam, south of Utrecht.  

One theory of why it is stolen so often is because the various theft attempts have defined its market value, making it easier to sell as stolen property.

In early April 2021, a person was arrested in the town of Baarn, as a suspect in the theft of Two Laughing Boys with a Mug of Beer and also of the theft of The Parsonage Garden at Nuenen by Vincent van Gogh which had been stolen from the Singer Laren museum in Laren in March 2020. Neither painting was recovered at that time. Art detective Arthur Brand told a reporter that the person in custody probably did not know the location of the works because "stolen artwork was often moved around quickly by criminal gangs". A BBC News item stated the value of the Frans Halls painting as "some €15m (£13m; $17.5m)" but provided no source for that information. An article published by The Guardian stated that the work "would be expected to fetch £13.4m at auction". On 24 September, the man was convicted of the thefts and sentenced to eight years imprisonment.

See also
List of paintings by Frans Hals

References

 Frans Hals', a catalogue raisonné of Hals works by Seymour Slive: Volume Three, the catalogue, National gallery of Art: Kress Foundation, Studies in the History of European Art, London - Phaidon Press, 1974

Dutch culture
Paintings by Frans Hals
1626 paintings
Food and drink paintings
Stolen works of art